Leonardo "Léo" Luiz e Castro (born 13 July 1994) is a Brazilian footballer who plays for Portuguesa as a forward.

Career statistics

References

1994 births
Living people
Brazilian footballers
Association football forwards
Grêmio Barueri Futebol players
União Agrícola Barbarense Futebol Clube players
Esporte Clube Internacional de Lages players
Nacional Atlético Clube (SP) players
Associação Ferroviária de Esportes players
Paraná Clube players
Oeste Futebol Clube players
Red Bull Brasil players
Clube Atlético Juventus players
São Bernardo Futebol Clube players
Associação Portuguesa de Desportos players
Footballers from São Paulo